In mathematics, Pontryagin duality is a duality between locally compact abelian groups that allows generalizing Fourier transform to all such groups, which include the circle group (the multiplicative group of complex numbers of modulus one), the finite abelian groups (with the discrete topology), and the additive group of the integers (also with the discrete topology), the real numbers, and every finite dimensional vector space over the reals or a -adic field.

The Pontryagin dual of a locally compact abelian group is the locally compact abelian topological group formed by the continuous group homomorphisms from the group to the circle group with the operation of pointwise multiplication and the topology of uniform convergence on compact sets. The Pontryagin duality theorem establishes Pontryagin duality by stating that any locally compact abelian group is naturally isomorphic with its bidual (the dual of its dual). The Fourier inversion theorem is a special case of this theorem.

The subject is named after Lev Pontryagin who laid down the foundations for the theory of locally compact abelian groups and their duality during his early mathematical works in 1934. Pontryagin's treatment relied on the groups being second-countable and either compact or discrete. This was improved to cover the general locally compact abelian groups by Egbert van Kampen in 1935 and André Weil in 1940.

Introduction
Pontryagin duality places in a unified context a number of observations about functions on the real line or on finite abelian groups:

 Suitably regular complex-valued periodic functions on the real line have Fourier series and these functions can be recovered from their Fourier series;
 Suitably regular complex-valued functions on the real line have Fourier transforms that are also functions on the real line and, just as for periodic functions, these functions can be recovered from their Fourier transforms; and
 Complex-valued functions on a finite abelian group have discrete Fourier transforms, which are functions on the dual group, which is a (non-canonically) isomorphic group. Moreover, any function on a finite abelian group can be recovered from its discrete Fourier transform.

The theory, introduced by Lev Pontryagin and combined with the Haar measure introduced by John von Neumann, André Weil and others depends on the theory of the dual group of a locally compact abelian group.

It is analogous to the dual vector space of a vector space: a finite-dimensional vector space V and its dual vector space V* are not naturally isomorphic, but the endomorphism algebra (matrix algebra) of one is isomorphic to the opposite of the endomorphism algebra of the other:  via the transpose. Similarly, a group  and its dual group  are not in general isomorphic, but their endomorphism rings are opposite to each other: . More categorically, this is not just an isomorphism of endomorphism algebras, but a contravariant equivalence of categories – see categorical considerations.

Definition

A topological group is a locally compact group if the underlying topological space is locally compact and Hausdorff; a topological group is abelian if the underlying group is abelian.
Examples of locally compact abelian groups include finite abelian groups, the integers (both for the discrete topology, which is also induced by the usual metric), the real numbers, the circle group T (both with their usual metric topology), and also the p-adic numbers (with their usual p-adic topology).

That is,

For example,

The Pontryagin duality theorem

That is, 

In other words, each group element  is identified to the evaluation character on the dual. This is strongly analogous to the canonical isomorphism between a finite-dimensional vector space and its double dual, and it is worth mentioning that any vector space  is an Abelian group. If  is a finite abelian group, then  but this isomorphism is not canonical. Making this statement precise (in general) requires thinking about dualizing not only on groups, but also on maps  between the groups, in order to treat dualization as a functor and prove the identity functor and the dualization functor are not naturally equivalent. Also the duality theorem implies that for any group (not necessarily finite) the dualization functor is an exact functor.

Pontryagin duality and the Fourier transform

Haar measure

"Sufficiently regular subset" here means a Borel set; that is, an element of the σ-algebra generated by the compact sets.

The Haar measure on  allows us to define the notion of integral for (complex-valued) Borel functions defined on the group.  In particular, one may consider various Lp spaces associated to the Haar measure μ. Specifically,

However, the –norm on this space depends on the choice of Haar measure, so if one wants to talk about isometries it is important to keep track of the Haar measure being used.

Fourier transform and Fourier inversion formula for L1-functions 

The dual group of a locally compact abelian group is used as the underlying space for an abstract version of the Fourier transform.  If , then the Fourier transform  is the function  on  defined by

This is also denoted . Note the Fourier transform depends on the choice of Haar measure.

where the integral is relative to the Haar measure  on the dual group .

The various Fourier transforms can be classified in terms of their domain and transform domain (the group and dual group) as follows (note that  is Circle group):

However, if we change the way we identify  with its dual group, by using the pairing

This convention minimizes the number of factors of  that show up in various places when computing Fourier transforms or inverse Fourier transforms on Euclidean space. (In effect it limits the  only to the exponent rather than as a pre-factor outside the integral sign.) Note that the choice of how to identify  with its dual group affects the meaning of the term "self-dual function", which is a function on  equal to its own Fourier transform: using the classical pairing  the function  is self-dual. But using the pairing, which keeps the pre-factor as unity,  makes  self-dual instead. See the next section on the group algebra. In addition, this form is also necessarily isometric on  spaces. See below at Plancherel and L2 Fourier inversion theorems.

The group algebra 

By the Fubini–Tonelli theorem, the convolution is submultiplicative with respect to the  norm, making  a Banach algebra. The Banach algebra  has a multiplicative identity element if and only if  is a discrete group, namely the function that is 1 at the identity and zero elsewhere. In general, however, it has an approximate identity which is a net (or generalized sequence)  indexed on a directed set  such that 

The Fourier transform takes convolution to multiplication, i.e. it is a homomorphism of abelian Banach algebras  (of norm ≤ 1):

In particular, to every group character on  corresponds a unique multiplicative linear functional on the group algebra defined by

This means the Fourier transform is a special case of the Gelfand transform.

Plancherel and L2 Fourier inversion theorems 
As we have stated, the dual group of a locally compact abelian group is a locally compact abelian group in its own right and thus has a Haar measure, or more precisely a whole family of scale-related Haar measures.

and we have the formula

To define the  Fourier transform one has to resort to some technical trick such as starting on a dense subspace like the continuous functions with compact support and then extending the isometry by continuity to the whole space. This unitary extension of the Fourier transform is what we mean by the Fourier transform on the space of square integrable functions.

The dual group also has an inverse Fourier transform in its own right; it can be characterized as the inverse (or adjoint, since it is unitary) of the  Fourier transform. This is the content of the  Fourier inversion formula which follows.

In the case  the dual group  is naturally isomorphic to the group of integers  and the Fourier transform specializes to the computation of coefficients of Fourier series of periodic functions.

If  is a finite group, we recover the discrete Fourier transform.  Note that this case is very easy to prove directly.

Bohr compactification and almost-periodicity

One important application of Pontryagin duality is the following characterization of compact abelian topological groups:

One uses Pontryagin duality to prove the converses.

The Bohr compactification is defined for any topological group , regardless of whether  is locally compact or abelian. One use made of Pontryagin duality between compact abelian groups and discrete abelian groups is to characterize the  Bohr compactification of an arbitrary abelian locally compact topological group. Since the inclusion map

is continuous and a homomorphism, the dual morphism
			
is a morphism into a compact group which is easily shown to satisfy the requisite universal property.

Categorical considerations 

Pontryagin duality can also profitably be considered functorially. In what follows, LCA is the category of locally compact abelian groups and continuous group homomorphisms.
A categorical formulation of Pontryagin duality then states that the natural transformation between the identity functor on LCA and the double dual functor is an isomorphism. This isomorphism is analogous to the double dual of finite-dimensional vector spaces (a special case, for real and complex vector spaces).

An immediate consequence of this formulation is another common categorical formulation of Pontryagin duality: the dual group functor is an equivalence of categories from LCA to LCAop.

The duality interchanges the subcategories of discrete groups and compact groups. The ring  of endomorphisms in LCA is changed by duality into its opposite ring (change the multiplication to the other order). For example, if  is an infinite cyclic discrete group,  is a circle group: the former has  so this is true also of the latter.

Generalizations

Generalizations of Pontryagin duality are constructed in two main directions: for commutative topological groups that are not locally compact, and for noncommutative topological groups. The theories in these two cases are very different.

Dualities for commutative topological groups 

If this mapping is an isomorphism, it is said that  satisfies Pontryagin duality (or that  is a reflexive group, or a reflective group). This has been extended in a number of directions beyond the case that  is locally compact.

In particular, Samuel Kaplan showed in 1948 and 1950 that arbitrary products and countable inverse limits of locally compact (Hausdorff) abelian groups satisfy Pontryagin duality. Note that an infinite product of locally compact non-compact spaces is not locally compact.

Later, in 1975, Rangachari Venkataraman showed, among other facts, that every open subgroup of an abelian topological group which satisfies Pontryagin duality itself satisfies Pontryagin duality.

More recently, Sergio Ardanza-Trevijano and María Jesús Chasco have extended the results of Kaplan mentioned above. They showed that direct and inverse limits of sequences of abelian groups satisfying Pontryagin duality also satisfy Pontryagin duality if the groups are metrizable or -spaces but not necessarily locally compact, provided some extra conditions are satisfied by the sequences.

However, there is a fundamental aspect that changes if we want to consider Pontryagin duality beyond the locally compact case. Elena Martín-Peinador proved in 1995 that if  is a Hausdorff abelian topological group that satisfies Pontryagin duality, and the natural evaluation pairing

is (jointly) continuous, then  is locally compact. As a corollary, all non-locally compact examples of Pontryagin duality are groups where the pairing  is not (jointly) continuous.

Another way to generalize Pontryagin duality to wider classes of commutative topological groups is to endow the dual group  with a bit different topology, namely the topology of uniform convergence on totally bounded sets. The groups satisfying the identity  under this assumption are called stereotype groups. This class is also very wide (and it contains locally compact abelian groups), but it is narrower than the class of reflective groups.

Pontryagin duality for topological vector spaces 
In 1952 Marianne F. Smith noticed that Banach spaces and reflexive spaces, being considered as topological groups (with the additive group operation), satisfy Pontryagin duality. Later B. S. Brudovskiĭ, William C. Waterhouse and K. Brauner showed that this result can be extended to the class of all quasi-complete barreled spaces (in particular, to all Fréchet spaces). In the 1990s Sergei Akbarov gave a description of the class of the topological vector spaces that satisfy a stronger property than the classical Pontryagin reflexivity, namely, the identity
 
The spaces of this class are called stereotype spaces, and the corresponding theory found a series of applications in Functional analysis and Geometry, including the generalization of Pontryagin duality for non-commutative topological groups.

Dualities for non-commutative topological groups
So the problem of constructing duality in this situation requires complete rethinking.

Theories built to date are divided into two main groups: the theories where the dual object has the same nature as the source one (like in the Pontryagin duality itself), and the theories where the source object and its dual differ from each other so radically that it is impossible to count them as objects of one class.

The second type theories were historically the first: soon after Pontryagin's work Tadao Tannaka (1938) and Mark Krein (1949) constructed a duality theory for arbitrary compact groups known now as the Tannaka–Krein duality. In this theory the dual object for a group  is not a group but a category of its representations .

The theories of first type appeared later and the key example for them was the duality theory for finite groups. In this theory the category of finite groups is embedded by the operation  of taking group algebra  (over ) into the category of finite dimensional Hopf algebras, so that the Pontryagin duality functor  turns into the operation  of taking the dual vector space (which is a duality functor in the category of finite dimensional Hopf algebras).

In 1973 Leonid I. Vainerman, George I. Kac, Michel Enock, and Jean-Marie Schwartz built a general theory of this type for all locally compact groups. From the 1980s the research in this area was resumed after the discovery of quantum groups, to which the constructed theories began to be actively transferred. These theories are formulated in the language of C*-algebras, or Von Neumann algebras, and one of its variants is the recent theory of locally compact quantum groups.

One of the drawbacks of these general theories, however, is that in them the objects generalizing the concept of group are not Hopf algebras in the usual algebraic sense. This deficiency can be corrected (for some classes of groups) within the framework of duality theories constructed on the basis of the notion of envelope of topological algebra.

See also
 Peter–Weyl theorem
 Cartier duality
 Stereotype space

Notes

References

Harmonic analysis
Duality theories
Theorems in analysis
Fourier analysis
Lp spaces